Amsterdam Roller Derby is a women's flat track roller derby league based in Amsterdam, Netherlands. Founded in 2009, the league consists of two teams which compete against teams from other leagues, and is a member of the Women's Flat Track Derby Association (WFTDA).

History
Amsterdam Roller Derby was founded in 2009, the first league in the Netherlands. By 2010, it was one of four leagues in the country, and in 2011 it was featured on national television, on "Hart Van Nederland".

In October 2013, Amsterdam was accepted as a member of the Women's Flat Track Derby Association Apprentice Programme,. and Amsterdam became a  WFTDA full member league in December 2014.

The team was founded as "Amsterdam Derby Dames", and in 2017, the organisation rebranded as "Amsterdam Roller Derby".

In early 2018, the B.ADD Girls were renamed the "BattleStars".

WFTDA rankings

References

Roller derby in the Netherlands
Roller derby leagues
Roller derby leagues established in 2009
Sports competitions in Amsterdam
2009 establishments in the Netherlands
Women in Amsterdam